Willful may refer to:
 Willful blindness, intentionally putting oneself in a position where oneself will be unaware of facts that would render oneself liable
 Willful damage, vandalism
 Willful violation

Media
 Willful Murder, a 1981 Japanese drama film directed by Kei Kumai
 The Willful Child, a German fairy tale collected by the Brothers Grimm
 The Willful Wife, an 1845 French ballet